Juliff is an unincorporated community situated along Farm to Market Road 521 (FM 521) in eastern Fort Bend County, Texas, United States. The settlement was founded in the 1850s as a shipping point along the Brazos River and the railroad reached there in the same decade. The community received postal service in 1891, and except for a brief closure, retained it until the late 1950s. Starting in the 1930s, Juliff enjoyed a heyday as a place of raucous entertainment after local residents opened several taverns and dance halls. This era ended in the 1960s when the bars relocated to Houston. Sometime later, the railroad that ran alongside FM 521 was discontinued. In December 2013 the community was a collection of homes along the east side of FM 521.

Geography
Juliff is located on FM 521 (former State Highway 288) between County Road 56 (Juliff-Manvel Road) and County Road 57 (Fort Bend County Road). In 2008 Juliff's site was indicated by a signpost on FM 521 (Almeda Road).

History
During the Antebellum (pre-Civil War) period the area was within the Arcola Plantation. The community received its name from John J. Juliff, a settler. In the 1850s the community served as a Brazos River shipping point. In 1858 the Houston Tap and Brazoria Railway opened in the community. In 1891 the community received a post office. In 1896 a general store appeared. The post office closed in 1908 and reopened in 1914. In 1933 a man named Thurman "Doc" Duke purchased several acres of land by the railroad line, opened a store, and leased the remaining land to other tenants. The tenants opened a dance hall and a group of taverns. This led to Juliff gaining a concentration of consumption of alcohol, gambling, and prostitution. The population of Juliff began to know the town by the name "Diddy Wa Diddy," after a song. By 1940 Juliff had around 50 residents, a church, and three businesses. During the 1940s the population increased to 150. The post office closed in 1958. By the 1960s the bars closed or relocated to Houston. A 1963 United States Geological Survey map shows the Missouri Pacific Railroad running parallel with State Highway 288 (SH 288) through the town. By the 1980s the community consisted of several scattered houses. By 2014 railroad tracks had been removed.

Government and infrastructire
Fort Bend County does not have a hospital district. OakBend Medical Center serves as the county's charity hospital which the county contracts with.

Education
Juliff is zoned to schools in the Fort Bend Independent School District. The community is within the East Division, controlling school board slots 5 through 7. As of 2008 the board members in the slots are Laurie Caldwell, Steve Smelley, and David Reitz, respectively.

Zoned schools include:
Schiff Elementary School (Missouri City)
Billy Baines Middle School (Unincorporated area)
Hightower High School (Missouri City)

Prior to the opening of Hightower, Elkins High School served Juliff.

See also

References

External links

Unincorporated communities in Fort Bend County, Texas
Unincorporated communities in Texas